Kukok (also Romanized as Kūkok and Kow Kok; also known as Kabkābād and ’oseynābād-e Kūkok) is a village in Tang Chenar Rural District, in the Central District of Mehriz County, Yazd Province, Iran. At the 2006 census, its population was 122, in 39 families.

References 

Populated places in Mehriz County